Jonathan Fisher (1768–1847) was American religious leader.

Jonathan Fisher may also refer to:

 Jonathan Fisher (painter) (1740–1809), Irish
 Jonathan Fisher (priest) (fl. 1805), Archdeacon of Barnstaple
 Jonathan Fisher (barrister), English lawyer
 Jonathan Fisher (Jeopardy! contestant), a contestant on Jeopardy!

See also 
John Fisher (disambiguation)